Kali Charan Nigam Institute of Technology (KCNIT) is private engineering college based in Banda, Uttar Pradesh, India. It was approved by the All India Council For Technical Education (AICTE) (Institute ID 1-20221111), Ministry of Human Resource Development, and Government of India, New Delhi, as well as the Uttar Pradesh State Government and is affiliated with the Dr. A.P.J. Abdul Kalam Technical University (APJAKTU), Lucknow, Uttar Pradesh. 

The current administration is composed of Dr. Sanjeev Shukla (Dean) and Mr. Arun Kumar Nigam (Chairman).

History

Established in 2002, the institute was founded by the Aegis of Banda Education Center to provide engineering and management education to students in the Bundelkhand region. The college offers 15 courses, including Bachelor of Engineering (BE) and Diploma of Engineering along with Masters of Business Administration (MBA), and has been deemed the "Best Engineering College in Bundelkhand". The tuition depends on the category of admission and vary from year to year.

Courses
Engineering Disciplines
Computer Science & Engineering
Information Technologies
Mechanical Engineering
Electrical & Electronics
Electronics & Communication
Civil Engineering
Masters in Business Administration
Marketing
Finance
Human Resource Management
Polytechnic
Diploma in Technical Education

References

External links

Engineering colleges in Uttar Pradesh
Banda district, India
Educational institutions established in 2002
2002 establishments in Uttar Pradesh
Dr. A.P.J. Abdul Kalam Technical University